Herbert Roberts may refer to:

 Herbie Roberts (1905–1944), English footballer
 Herbert Roberts (footballer) (1890–?), Australian footballer for Melbourne
 Ray Roberts (full name Herbert Ray Roberts) (1913–1992), US congressman